Tingena paula is a species of moth in the family Oecophoridae. It is endemic to New Zealand and has been observed in Canterbury. Adults of this species are on the wing in November.

Taxonomy 

This species was first described by Alfred Philpott in 1927 using specimens collected by S. Lindsay at Pukeatua Bush, Banks Peninsula in November. Philpott originally named the species Borkhausenia paula. In 1928 George Hudson discussed and illustrated this species in his 1928 publication The butterflies and moths of New Zealand using the same name.  In 1988 J. S. Dugdale placed this species within the genus Tingena. The male holotype is held in the Canterbury Museum.

Description 

Philpott described the species as follows:

This species is small and is similar in appearance to T. maranta but has less pointed forewings.

Distribution
This species is endemic to New Zealand and has been observed in Canterbury. This species has also been found in a site of ecological significance in Christchurch as set out in the Christchurch District Plan.

Behaviour 
Adults of this species is on the wing in November.

References

Oecophoridae
Moths of New Zealand
Moths described in 1927
Endemic fauna of New Zealand
Taxa named by Alfred Philpott
Endemic moths of New Zealand